Waryam railway station is located in Pakistan.  It is one of the oldest railway stations in Pakistan with historic values. Waryam junction is the point where the one line track is extended to two line tracks.

See also
 List of railway stations in Pakistan
 Pakistan Railways

References

External links

Railway stations in Jhang District
Railway stations on Shorkot–Lalamusa Branch Line